"She Loves You" is a song by the Beatles.

She Loves You may also refer to:
 She Loves You (The Twilight Singers album)
 She Loves You (Yui album)
 She Loves You (Misato Watanabe album)
 California Sun / She Loves You, an album by the Crickets

See also
She Loves Me, a musical